Abortion in Guam is legal, but there were no abortion providers in Guam .

History 
Abortion, also known as pokká, was first documented in Guam in the 1750s. Chamorro women sought  suicide, sterilization, or abortion as they did not wish to birth a child into the "subjugation of the Spaniards". Early methods utilized by Chamorro women to self-induce abortion included consuming drinks made from tree trunks, roots, and leaves.

Abortion access 
During the 1990s, women who needed abortions often traveled to the Philippines to get an abortion as there were no legal options on the island.  From 2000 to 2018, two medical providers performed the majority of abortions on Guam. However, after the last doctor providing abortion services retired in June 2018, women were left with few options for legal abortion services. Women seeking abortion may pay out-of-pocket to travel to Hawaii or Japan. Guam's Governor Lou Leon Guerrero has publicly supported the recruitment of an abortion provider to Guam.

Legislative and judicial history 

As a United States territory, Guam is subject to federal legislation of the United States. In 1990, the Legislature of Guam enacted a law prohibiting abortion in all cases except when there was "substantial risk" to the woman's life or continuing the pregnancy would "gravely impair" her health. This law was challenged by the American Civil Liberties Union and struck down by the ninth circuit court of Guam in a case called Guam Society of Obstetricians and Gynecologists v. Ada in 1997. In 2012, the Woman's Reproductive Health Information Act was passed, creating new restrictions for abortion provision, including a 13-week gestational age limit, a physician-only requirement, and a 24-hour mandatory waiting period.

Hospital and clinic history 
There were no clinics or doctors providing abortion services during much of the 1990s. Since the 2000s and up to 2016, there were two doctors who performed abortions in Guam.  That year on November 30, Dr. Edmund Griley at the Guam PolyClinic  retired and then Dr. William Freeman at the Women's Clinic retired in June 2018. This left Guam without an abortion provider. Dr. Jeffrey Gabel took over the Women's Clinic in June 2018 and renamed it the Dr. Gabel's Clinic Obstetrics & Gynecology Para Famalao’an but since Gabel is personally opposed to abortion, he refused to provide abortion services. Guam Memorial Hospital  did not openly provide abortions and refused to refer women with life-threatening conditions to other medical facilities for abortions. Guam Regional Medical City also did not have any doctors willing to openly provide abortions and they did not provide referrals to doctors who provided them.  Department of Public Health and Social Services also refused to provide abortion referrals.

Statistics 
In 2017, 239 abortions were performed, and 97% of these abortions utilized surgical intervention, such as dilation and curettage or intrauterine saline infusion. All but three abortions were performed at Women's Clinic. As legal abortion is no longer readily available in Guam, the current rate of abortion is not known.

Anti-abortion and abortion rights movements 
The Catholic Church in Guam is active in support of restrictions on abortion through participation in the Rally for Life march.

References 

Guamanian law
Society of Guam
Guam
Guam
Guam
Health in Guam
Women in Guam